Naturally occurring zirconium (40Zr) is composed of four stable isotopes (of which one may in the future be found radioactive), and one very long-lived radioisotope (96Zr), a primordial nuclide that decays via double beta decay with an observed half-life of 2.0×1019 years; it can also undergo single beta decay, which is not yet observed, but the theoretically predicted value of t1/2 is 2.4×1020 years. The second most stable radioisotope is 93Zr, which has a half-life of 1.53 million years. Thirty other radioisotopes have been observed. All have half-lives less than a day except for 95Zr (64.02 days), 88Zr (83.4 days), and 89Zr (78.41 hours). The primary decay mode is electron capture for isotopes lighter than 92Zr, and the primary mode for heavier isotopes is beta decay.

List of isotopes 

|-
| 78Zr
| style="text-align:right" | 40
| style="text-align:right" | 38
| 77.95523(54)#
| 50# ms[>170 ns]
|
|
| 0+
|
|
|-
| rowspan=2|79Zr
| rowspan=2 style="text-align:right" | 40
| rowspan=2 style="text-align:right" | 39
| rowspan=2|78.94916(43)#
| rowspan=2|56(30) ms
| β+, p
| 78Sr
| rowspan=2|5/2+#
| rowspan=2|
| rowspan=2|
|-
| β+
| 79Y
|-
| 80Zr
| style="text-align:right" | 40
| style="text-align:right" | 40
| 79.9404(16)
| 4.6(6) s
| β+
| 80Y
| 0+
|
|
|-
| rowspan=2|81Zr
| rowspan=2 style="text-align:right" | 40
| rowspan=2 style="text-align:right" | 41
| rowspan=2|80.93721(18)
| rowspan=2|5.5(4) s
| β+ (>99.9%)
| 81Y
| rowspan=2|(3/2−)#
| rowspan=2|
| rowspan=2|
|-
| β+, p (<.1%)
| 80Sr
|-
| 82Zr
| style="text-align:right" | 40
| style="text-align:right" | 42
| 81.93109(24)#
| 32(5) s
| β+
| 82Y
| 0+
|
|
|-
| rowspan=2|83Zr
| rowspan=2 style="text-align:right" | 40
| rowspan=2 style="text-align:right" | 43
| rowspan=2|82.92865(10)
| rowspan=2|41.6(24) s
| β+ (>99.9%)
| 83Y
| rowspan=2|(1/2−)#
| rowspan=2|
| rowspan=2|
|-
| β+, p (<.1%)
| 82Sr
|-
| 84Zr
| style="text-align:right" | 40
| style="text-align:right" | 44
| 83.92325(21)#
| 25.9(7) min
| β+
| 84Y
| 0+
|
|
|-
| 85Zr
| style="text-align:right" | 40
| style="text-align:right" | 45
| 84.92147(11)
| 7.86(4) min
| β+
| 85Y
| 7/2+
|
|
|-
| rowspan=2 style="text-indent:1em" | 85mZr
| rowspan=2 colspan="3" style="text-indent:2em" | 292.2(3) keV
| rowspan=2|10.9(3) s
| IT (92%)
| 85Zr
| rowspan=2|(1/2−)
| rowspan=2|
| rowspan=2|
|-
| β+ (8%)
| 85Y
|-
| 86Zr
| style="text-align:right" | 40
| style="text-align:right" | 46
| 85.91647(3)
| 16.5(1) h
| β+
| 86Y
| 0+
|
|
|-
| 87Zr
| style="text-align:right" | 40
| style="text-align:right" | 47
| 86.914816(9)
| 1.68(1) h
| β+
| 87Y
| (9/2)+
|
|
|-
| style="text-indent:1em" | 87mZr
| colspan="3" style="text-indent:2em" | 335.84(19) keV
| 14.0(2) s
| IT
| 87Zr
| (1/2)−
| 
| 
|-
| 88Zr
| style="text-align:right" | 40
| style="text-align:right" | 48
| 87.910227(11)
| 83.4(3) d
| EC
| 88Y
| 0+
|
|
|-
| 89Zr
| style="text-align:right" | 40
| style="text-align:right" | 49
| 88.908890(4)
| 78.41(12) h
| β+
| 89Y
| 9/2+
|
|
|-
| rowspan=2 style="text-indent:1em" | 89mZr
| rowspan=2 colspan="3" style="text-indent:2em" | 587.82(10) keV
| rowspan=2|4.161(17) min
| IT (93.77%)
| 89Zr
| rowspan=2|1/2−
| rowspan=2|
| rowspan=2|
|-
| β+ (6.23%)
| 89Y
|-
| 90Zr
| style="text-align:right" | 40
| style="text-align:right" | 50
| 89.9047044(25)
| colspan=3 align=center|Stable
| 0+
| 0.5145(40)
|
|-
| style="text-indent:1em" | 90m1Zr
| colspan="3" style="text-indent:2em" | 2319.000(10) keV
| 809.2(20) ms
| IT
| 90Zr
| 5-
|
|
|-
| style="text-indent:1em" | 90m2Zr
| colspan="3" style="text-indent:2em" | 3589.419(16) keV
| 131(4) ns
|
|
| 8+
|
|
|-
| 91Zr
| style="text-align:right" | 40
| style="text-align:right" | 51
| 90.9056458(25)
| colspan=3 align=center|Stable
| 5/2+
| 0.1122(5)
|
|-
| style="text-indent:1em" | 91mZr
| colspan="3" style="text-indent:2em" | 3167.3(4) keV
| 4.35(14) μs
|
|
| (21/2+)
|
|
|-
| 92Zr
| style="text-align:right" | 40
| style="text-align:right" | 52
| 91.9050408(25)
| colspan=3 align=center|Stable
| 0+
| 0.1715(8)
|
|-
| rowspan=2 | 93Zr
| rowspan=2 style="text-align:right" | 40
| rowspan=2 style="text-align:right" | 53
| rowspan=2 | 92.9064760(25)
| rowspan=2 | 1.53(10)×106 y
| β− (73%)
| 93mNb
| rowspan=2 | 5/2+
| rowspan=2 |
| rowspan=2 |
|-
| β− (27%)
| 93Nb
|-
| 94Zr
| style="text-align:right" | 40
| style="text-align:right" | 54
| 93.9063152(26)
| colspan=3 align=center|Observationally stable
| 0+
| 0.1738(28)
|
|-
| 95Zr
| style="text-align:right" | 40
| style="text-align:right" | 55
| 94.9080426(26)
| 64.032(6) d
| β−
| 95Nb
| 5/2+
|
|
|-
| 96Zr
| style="text-align:right" | 40
| style="text-align:right" | 56
| 95.9082734(30)
| 20(4)×1018 y
| β−β−
| 96Mo
| 0+
| 0.0280(9)
|
|-
| 97Zr
| style="text-align:right" | 40
| style="text-align:right" | 57
| 96.9109531(30)
| 16.744(11) h
| β−
| 97mNb
| 1/2+
|
|
|-
| 98Zr
| style="text-align:right" | 40
| style="text-align:right" | 58
| 97.912735(21)
| 30.7(4) s
| β−
| 98Nb
| 0+
|
|
|-
| 99Zr
| style="text-align:right" | 40
| style="text-align:right" | 59
| 98.916512(22)
| 2.1(1) s
| β−
| 99mNb
| 1/2+
|
|
|-
| 100Zr
| style="text-align:right" | 40
| style="text-align:right" | 60
| 99.91776(4)
| 7.1(4) s
| β−
| 100Nb
| 0+
|
|
|-
| 101Zr
| style="text-align:right" | 40
| style="text-align:right" | 61
| 100.92114(3)
| 2.3(1) s
| β−
| 101Nb
| 3/2+
|
|
|-
| 102Zr
| style="text-align:right" | 40
| style="text-align:right" | 62
| 101.92298(5)
| 2.9(2) s
| β−
| 102Nb
| 0+
|
|
|-
| 103Zr
| style="text-align:right" | 40
| style="text-align:right" | 63
| 102.92660(12)
| 1.3(1) s
| β−
| 103Nb
| (5/2−)
|
|
|-
| 104Zr
| style="text-align:right" | 40
| style="text-align:right" | 64
| 103.92878(43)#
| 1.2(3) s
| β−
| 104Nb
| 0+
|
|
|-
| rowspan=2|105Zr
| rowspan=2 style="text-align:right" | 40
| rowspan=2 style="text-align:right" | 65
| rowspan=2|104.93305(43)#
| rowspan=2|0.6(1) s
| β− (>99.9%)
| 105Nb
| rowspan=2|
| rowspan=2|
| rowspan=2|
|-
| β−, n (<.1%)
| 104Nb
|-
| 106Zr
| style="text-align:right" | 40
| style="text-align:right" | 66
| 105.93591(54)#
| 200# ms[>300 ns]
| β−
| 106Nb
| 0+
|
|
|-
| 107Zr
| style="text-align:right" | 40
| style="text-align:right" | 67
| 106.94075(32)#
| 150# ms[>300 ns]
| β−
| 107Nb
|
|
|
|-
| 108Zr
| style="text-align:right" | 40
| style="text-align:right" | 68
| 107.94396(64)#
| 80# ms[>300 ns]
| β−
| 108Nb
| 0+
|
|
|-
| 109Zr
| style="text-align:right" | 40
| style="text-align:right" | 69
| 108.94924(54)#
| 60# ms[>300 ns]
|
|
|
|
|
|-
| 110Zr
| style="text-align:right" | 40
| style="text-align:right" | 70
| 109.95287(86)#
| 30# ms[>300 ns]
|
|
| 0+
|
|
|-
| 111Zr
| style="text-align:right" | 40
| style="text-align:right" | 71
| 
| 
|
|
|
|
|
|-
| 112Zr
| style="text-align:right" | 40
| style="text-align:right" | 72
| 
| 
|
|
| 0+
|
|
|-
| 113Zr
| style="text-align:right" | 40
| style="text-align:right" | 73
| 
| 
|
|
|
|
|
|-
| 114Zr
| style="text-align:right" | 40
| style="text-align:right" | 74
| 
| 
|
|
| 0+
|
|

Zirconium-88
88Zr is a radioisotope of zirconium with a half-life of 83.4 days. In January 2019, this isotope was discovered to have a neutron capture cross section of approximately 861,000 barns; this is several orders of magnitude greater than predicted, and greater than that of any other nuclide except xenon-135.

Zirconium-89
89Zr is a radioisotope of zirconium with a half-life of 78.41 hours. It is produced by proton irradiation of natural yttrium-89. Its most prominent gamma photon has an energy of 909 keV.

Zirconium-89 is employed in specialized diagnostic applications using positron emission tomography imaging, for example, with zirconium-89 labeled antibodies (immuno-PET). For a decay table, see

Zirconium-93

93Zr is a radioisotope of zirconium with a half-life of 1.53 million years, decaying through emission of a low-energy beta particle. 73% of decays populate an excited state of niobium-93, which decays with a halflife of 14 years and a low-energy gamma ray to the stable ground state of 93Nb, while the remaining 27% of decays directly populate the  ground state. It is one of only 7 long-lived fission products. The low specific activity and low energy of its radiations limit the radioactive hazards of this isotope.

Nuclear fission produces it at a fission yield of 6.3% (thermal neutron fission of 235U), on a par with the other most abundant fission products. Nuclear reactors usually contain large amounts of zirconium as fuel rod cladding (see zircaloy), and neutron irradiation of 92Zr also produces some 93Zr, though this is limited by 92Zr's low neutron capture cross section of 0.22 barns. Indeed one of the primary reasons for using zirconium in fuel rod cladding is its low cross section.

93Zr also has a low neutron capture cross section of 0.7 barns. Most fission zirconium consists of other isotopes; the other isotope with a significant neutron absorption cross section is 91Zr with a cross section of 1.24 barns. 93Zr is a less attractive candidate for disposal by nuclear transmutation than are 99Tc and 129I. Mobility in soil is relatively low, so that geological disposal may be an adequate solution. Alternatively, if the effect on the neutron economy of 's higher cross section is deemed acceptable, irradiated cladding and fission product Zirconium (which are mixed together in most current nuclear reprocessing methods) could be used to form new zircalloy cladding. Once the cladding is inside the reactor, the relatively low level radioactivity can be tolerated, but transport and manufacturing might require special precautions.

References 

 Isotope masses from:

 Isotopic compositions and standard atomic masses from:

 Half-life, spin, and isomer data selected from the following sources.

 
Zirconium